Sampson Cudjoe (born June 22, 1988) is a Ghanaian footballer, who is currently playing for Accra Hearts of Oak SC in the Ghana Premier League.

Career 
Cudjoe is rated as one of the biggest talents of Ghana, he began his career by Tudu Mighty Jets, before 2006 transferred to Kessben F.C., the club from Abrankese loaned him in to FC Honka from August 2008 until end of season. The central midfielder signed in summer 2010 for Ashanti Gold SC.

On August 5, 2011, it was announced that Cudjoe had joined Algerian side ES Sétif. However, the move did not materialize and the player was instead linked with a move to Egyptian side Zamalek SC.

On 23 August 2013, he moved to Hearts of Oak from Medeama SC on a three-year deal.

Position 

Personal 
Sampson is also the cousin of Isaac Vorsah.

References

External links
Profile at fchonka.fi

1988 births
Living people
Ghanaian footballers
Ghanaian expatriate footballers
Association football midfielders
Expatriate footballers in Finland
Ghanaian expatriate sportspeople in Finland
Accra Hearts of Oak S.C. players
FC Honka players
Medeama SC players
Veikkausliiga players
People from Tamale, Ghana